Chollet or de Chollet is a French-language surname. Notable people with the name include:

 Derek Chollet, American diplomat 
 François Chollet, French software engineer and artificial intelligence researcher 
 Jean-Baptiste Chollet (1798–1892), French musician and singer
 Leroy Chollet (1924–1998), American basketball player 
 Louis Chollet (1815–1851), French organist and composer
 Marcel de Chollet (1855–1924), French-Swiss painter
 Maribel Chollet (born 1971), Mexican politician 

French-language surnames